The Asian Tour is the principal men's professional golf tour in Asia except for Japan, which has its own Japan Golf Tour, which is also a full member of the International Federation of PGA Tours. Official money events on the tour count for World Golf Ranking points.

The Asian Tour is administered from Singapore. It is controlled by a board with a majority of professional golfers, and a Tournament Players Committee of its player members, supported by an executive team. The chairman of the board is the Indonesian businessman Jimmy Masrin.

History
The Asian PGA was formed in July 1994 at a meeting in Hong Kong attended by PGA representatives from eight countries. The first season of the APGA Omega Tour, as it was known for sponsorship reasons, was played in 1995 and within a few years it had supplanted the existing tour in the region, the Asia Golf Circuit that was run by the Asia Pacific Golf Confederation, as the leading golf tour in Asia outside of Japan. In 1998 the Asian Tour became the sixth member of the International Federation of PGA Tours. Under a new sponsorship deal, between 1999 and 2003 the tour was known as the Davidoff Tour, before adopting its current name in 2004.

In 2002, the tour moved its office from Hong Kong to Malaysia and in 2004 the tour was taken over by a new organisation established by the players, who had been in dispute with the previous management. In 2007 it moved to new headquarters on the resort island of Sentosa in Singapore, which is also the home to what was at that time the tour's richest sole sanctioned tournament, the Singapore Open.

In 2009 a rival tour, the OneAsia Tour, was established. Relations between the two tours are hostile.

In 2010, the Asian Tour launched the Asian Development Tour (ADT) as a developmental circuit. Five events were played the first year. By 2015 the tour had expanded to holding 28 tournaments with US$2.2 million of prize money.

Players
Most of the leading players on the tour are Asian, but players from other parts of the world also participate (as of 2007 the country with most representatives profiled on the tour's official site is Australia).

In 2006 the Asian Tour became the most prestigious men's tour on which a woman has made the half-way cut in recent times when Michelle Wie did so at the SK Telecom Open in South Korea.

Among the ways to obtain an Asian Tour card is to be among the top 35 (including ties) at the Tour's qualifying school, finishing in the top 5 of the Asian Development Tour Order of Merit, and placing in the top 60 of the previous season's Order of Merit. The winner of the Asian Tour Order of Merit also receives entry into The Open Championship.

Tournaments and prize money

Each year the Asian Tour co-sanctions a number of events with the European Tour, with these events offering higher prize funds than most of the other tournaments on the tour as a result. While most of these tournaments have been in Asia, the Omega European Masters in Switzerland has been co-sanctioned from 2009 to 2017. In addition, the two tours sometimes tri-sanction events with the Sunshine Tour or PGA Tour of Australasia in those tours' respective regions. The Asian Tour also co-sanctions tournaments with the Japan Golf Tour.

Since 2008, 50 percent of players' earnings from the US Open and The Open Championship have counted towards the Asian Tour's Order of Merit. The two Opens were singled out from the other majors because they have open qualifying which Asian Tour members may enter.

Asia's richest event, the HSBC Champions, was first played in November 2005 with a prize fund of $5 million. The tournament is co-sanctioned by the Asian Tour and the earnings were counted towards the money list for its first three years before it became a World Golf Championships event in 2009. From 2009 to present, the earnings are not counted towards the Asian Tour Order of Merit.

Another limited-field event in Malaysia, the CIMB Classic, was launched in 2010 with a $6 million purse. The first Asian Tour event to be co-sanctioned by the US-based PGA Tour began as an unofficial event on that tour, but it started to offer official money and FedEx Cup points in 2013.

In 2016, the tour's richest sole-sanctioned event was the Venetian Macao Open, with a prize fund of $1.1 million.

Order of Merit winners

Leading career money winners
The table below shows the leading money winners on the Asian Tour as of 16 October 2016. The official site has a top 100 list which also shows each player's winnings for 1995 to 2016.

Awards

See also
List of golfers with most Asian Tour wins
Asian Development Tour
Ladies Asian Golf Tour

Notes

References

External links
Official site

 
Professional golf tours
Golf in Asia
Sports organisations of Singapore
1994 establishments in Hong Kong